Renan Nelson Rocha (born March 25, 1987 in Piracicaba) is a Brazilian goalkeeper. He currently plays for Atlético Paranaense.

References

External links
 Renan Rocha (Renan Nelson Rocha) - Futpédia

1987 births
Living people
People from Piracicaba
Brazilian footballers
Club Athletico Paranaense players
Association football goalkeepers
Esporte Clube XV de Novembro (Piracicaba) players
Santos FC players
Rio Branco Esporte Clube players
Campeonato Brasileiro Série A players
Footballers from São Paulo (state)